Margaret Bartholomew (October 8, 1903 – October 18, 1943) was the first, and only female, Civil Air Patrol member to die in service during World War II.

Biography
Lieuteant Margaret Bartholomew was the 154th charter member of the Ohio Wing of Civil Air Patrol, as well as being the Flight Leader of Flight C from Squadron 5111-1. Squadron 5111-1 was the original Cincinnati Squadron, and was based at Lunken Airport. Flight C was an all-female flight, and was composed of 50 pilots.

Bartholomew was returning to Cincinnati on October 18, 1943, from a courier mission out of Williamsport, Pennsylvania, when a sudden snowstorm plunged visibility to zero. She flew lower as she tried to find a safe place to land, but visibility was so poor that she crashed into a hill 55 miles northeast of Pittsburgh, approximately in Indiana, Pennsylvania.

Burial
Bartholomew is buried at Spring Grove Cemetery, Cincinnati, Ohio in Section 124, Lot 170.

References

1903 births
1943 deaths
American World War II pilots
Victims of aviation accidents or incidents in 1943
Aviators from Ohio
People of the Civil Air Patrol
American civilians killed in World War II
Aviators killed in aviation accidents or incidents in the United States
Burials at Spring Grove Cemetery